Winia Electronics, formerly named Daewoo Electronics, is a South Korean home appliances company and a member of South Korean Winia Group. Established in 1971, it has since grown into a global business with more than 64 production sites, research and development and sales centres in more than 40 countries worldwide. Daewoo Electronics Sales UK (DESUK) was established in November 1993. It is the third largest electronics firm of South Korea after Samsung and LG. The company manufactures a range of electronics and home appliances also some automotive electronic equipments and accessories by being the OEM to assist its parent company's motor vehicle subsidiaries Daewoo Motors which is currently divided among US based  Korean automotive manufacturer GM Korea & Tata Daewoo the manufacturer of Daewoo Heavy Diesel Commercial vehicles.

Venture into computers

The Daewoo CPC-300 was a home computer based on the MSX standard, and produced by a Korean company Daewoo Electronics Co. Ltd. as one of several models of series of MSX computers. It also has the logo IQ 2000 on top of the case.

The computer was made in the form of a keyboard. All the circuits of the computer are in the keyboard case. Two possible color versions exist - black with gray keys, and white with gray and blue keys. Both have a built-in power-supply. This version of an MSX computer does not have a floppy drive, and only one slot for cartridges on the top of the case.

Two varieties of this computer exist - the CPC-300 and the CPC-300E. The CPC-300E is a cut-down version of the CPC-300 for educational purpose, so it doesn't have joystick port.

The CPC-300 also exists in two regional versions - Korean, and an export version (no information about export variant for CPC-300E is known). The Export version does not have a special name.

Korean version
The keyboard contains symbols of Hangul and a special key (with the label «Hangul» in hangul), which switches input mode between English and hangul. This key has a LED indicator (similar to the CAPS LOCK key).

The power-on splash screen is different from the standard MSX splash screen, and displays the label "IQ 2000" in hangul. In the case of the CPC-300, which does have a real-time clock, the current date and time is also shown. After the splash screen, the MSX BASIC version screen appears. It contains the labels MSX BASIC version 2.0 Copyright 1985 by Microsoft (in English) and MSX Hangul version 3.00 Copyright 1986 by Daewoo (where Hangul and Daewoo written in hangul). After that, the MSX BASIC prompt appears on the screen (there is no standard prompt with version strings).

MSX-BASIC on this computer has a special monochromatic high-resolution display mode, for displaying hangul symbols. This mode can be enabled by the command SCREEN 9. Technically, this mode is a software-modified SCREEN 6 mode. So, the VDP of this computer is a standard Yamaha V9938. The Mode SCREEN 9 in many Korean computers is a reason for rumors that they used a custom VDP, unofficially named the "V9948".

Export version
The keyboard does not have hangul symbols. Instead diacritic marks are used. The input mode key in this version does not have an LED and is lettered 'CODE'.

No information about the power-on splash screen for the export version is known.

Technical specifications
These specifications are the same for all versions:

TV standard: NTSC
Outputs for connection with a TV set or computer display:
RF modulator output
Audio and video connector (sound output is mono)
RGB
«Monochromatic/Colour» switch
RF modulator channel switch
Connectors:
Printer port
Cartridge port
Tape recorder in/out port
Power supply voltage: 110/220 V, 60 Hz (voltage switch on the underside of the case)
Power consumption: 21 W

CPC-300
RAM: 128 KB
VRAM: 128 KB
Other features:
Real-time clock with battery backup
Two joystick ports
one Light pen port
A built-in tutorial program called "MSX-TUTOR"

CPC-300E
RAM: 64 KB
VRAM: 128 KB
Other features:
No real-time clock
No joystick ports
No light pen port

MSX-TUTOR
The Korean modification of the CPC-300 has a built-in tutorial program (아이큐 교실 in the Korean language, means "IQ Tutorial"), named MSX-TUTOR. This program starts automatically after the computer powers on. The program can be exited manually by pressing the SELECT key, after that the MSX BASIC prompt appears. To disable MSX-TUTOR, the command SET SYSTEM 1 can be used. This setting is stored in the real-time clock memory. To re-enable MSX-TUTOR the command SET SYSTEM 0 can be used.

The CPC-300E does not have the MSX-TUTOR SET SYSTEM command with any parameter the use of which just causes the message 'Syntax error' to be displayed.

Usage in Russia
A modified version of the Daewoo CPC-300E was one of the types of MSX-computers which were distributed in Russia. At the present time, in some cities, 10-15 new and sealed computers can be found (some owners sell them at Russian online auctions). These computers were a property of some schools. These computers were bought to replace older MSX-based computer in classes which used the Yamaha YIS503 and Yamaha YIS805 (Yamaha distributed these computers in the USSR during the mid-1980s). For example, the Daewoo-based computers were used in the schools of Primorsky Krai. However, Daewoo computers, used for this purposes, were the standard Korean versions, and they do not contain Russian letters on the keyboard, as Yamaha's models did. Also an English manual is packaged with these computers.

Usage in Iran 
Some Refrigerator and TV products such as Daewoo TV DSL-55K5700UL are being sold in Iran since 2018. The other point is selling and buying home appliances from Iranian online stores which is common nowadays.

Acquisitions after bankruptcy 
The company's parent company went through a bankruptcy in 1999 due to the Asian financial crisis. After that, the company was owned completely by a group of creditors. Beside its business of manufacturing consumer goods, it has been contracted by different parties to set up local manufacturing units producing air-conditioners, refrigerators and washing machines. In October 2010, it was announced that the creditor group owning the company is to sell it to an Iran-based electronic company.

After years of trying, in January 2013, Dongbu Group (now known as DB Group) agreed to take over Daewoo Electronics for $270 million in order to attain synergies with DB families (Especially DB Inc., DB Hitek and Dongbu Steel). Daewoo Electronics became the family of DB Group by ending its workout status.

In March 2018, Dayou Group (now known as Winia Group) acquired Daewoo Electronics from DB Group.

Dayyani v. the Republic of Korea 
In November 2010, Iranian company Entekhab Industrial Group offered to buy Daewoo Electronics from its creditors for $US529 million. Swedish company Electrolux also made an offer of $513 million. Entekhab's offer was accepted, and it paid 57 billion won ($US49.67m) as a deposit, but in June 2011, creditors of Daewoo, led by state-run Korea Asset Management Corp (KAMCO), cancelled the contract and retained the deposit after Entekhab missed a scheduled payment and asked for a discount. KAMCO and other creditors began proceedings to sell the company to Electrolux. Entekhab said they viewed the cancellation of the deal as illegal, and said it would take legal action to stop the sale of the company to Electrolux. Entekhab later sought the return of the deposit, but the creditors refused, holding Entekhab responsible for the cancellation.

In 2015, a group of investors led by Mohammed Reza Dayyani, the largest shareholder of Entekhab, began arbitration proceedings at the International Center for Settlement of Investment Disputes (ICSID) seeking compensation from the South Korean government under the Iran-South Korea bilateral investment treaty for the investment deposit that they lost, plus interest. In June 2018, the ICSID ruled in favour of Dayyani. The Korean government appealed to the High Court of Justice in England, which in December 2019 denied the appeal. As a result of the ruling, the South Korean government must pay $62.9 million (73.0 billion won) to Dayyani and the other plaintiffs.

Resources

References

External links

 

Daewoo
Electronics companies of South Korea
Home appliance brands
Home appliance manufacturers of South Korea
Vacuum cleaner manufacturers
Heating, ventilation, and air conditioning companies
Manufacturing companies based in Seoul
Electronics companies established in 1971
Multinational companies headquartered in South Korea
South Korean brands
South Korean companies established in 1971